Preston Jones (born August 21, 1983) is an American actor, known for his roles in Detention, Spring Break '83, and Road Trip: Beer Pong.

Personal life
Preston was born in Dallas, Texas on August 21, 1983. He started acting his senior year in high school when he attended DeSoto High School in DeSoto, Texas, where he graduated in 2001. Preston then went on to study Theatre and Radio Television Film at The University of Texas at Austin. In Austin, he performed in over a dozen plays, getting the most acclaim for his performance in the John Patrick play, The Hasty Heart. To prepare for his role as the Scotsman, Lachlan McLachlan, Preston traveled to Scotland to research the Scottish culture and dialect. 

After graduating from UT Austin and acting in a few TV pilots (The WB's "Jack and Bobby" and Richard Linklater's HBO pilot, "$5.15/hr"), he moved to Los Angeles to pursue acting professionally. Since moving to Los Angeles, Preston has starred opposite Chris O'Donnell, Adam Goldberg, John Goodman, David Carradine, and DJ Qualls in both television and film. 

Preston has an identical twin brother, Drew, who lives in Fort Worth, Texas.
Preston married his high school friend Ashley Howe.

Filmography

Film

Television

External links
 

1983 births
American male film actors
American male television actors
Living people